Cupiennius foliatus is a banana spider species first documented in 1901 and found in Costa Rica and Panama.

References

Trechaleidae
Spiders of Central America
Spiders described in 1901